Nizar Lalani is a music producer from Pakistan. Lalani has produced renowned musical albums of Pakistan including Inquilaab by Junoon (band), Duur by Strings (band), Roshni by Hadiqa Kiani, and more.

Discography 
Lalani professionally started music production in 1991 and made his studio, the NL Studio on Tariq Road, Karachi. There he recorded greats such as Mehdi Hassan, Nusrat Fateh Ali Khan, Nayyara Noor, and several others. Lalani has also introduced some legendary names from the Pakistani pop music industry including Junoon, Strings, Hadiqa Kiani and Najam Shiraz.

Productions 
Nizar Lalani produced musical albums such as Inquilaab by Junoon, Duur by Strings, and Hadiqa Kiyani's album Roshni, which also featured her hit song Boohey Barian, that has been renditioned by a number of artists from India as well. He also produced Amir Zaki's only solo album, Signature, as well as Haroon and Fakhir's Jadoo Ka Charagh, and Najam Sheraz's In Se Nain. He has also played instruments and sung harmonies in countless hit songs including playing drums on Rahat Fateh Ali Khan's Indian debut, Mann Ki Lagan from the movie Paap.

Nizar Lalani has also worked for his highness, the Agha Khan, on several projects. He is the composer of the Signature Tune for Aga Khan University, in collaboration with the Cape Town Symphony Orchestra.

Most recently, his mixing and mastering work on Ustad Noor Baksh's debut release, Jingul, has brought him in the international limelight once again, with The Wire Magazine, dubbing him as a "storeyed music producer".

References

External links 

Pakistani musicians
Pakistani record producers
Pakistani multi-instrumentalists
Living people
Year of birth missing (living people)